Foreground Music (stylized all uppercase) is the fifth solo studio album by Ron Gallo, released on March 3, 2023, through Kill Rock Stars.

Background and recording 
Ron Gallo described the album as "what would an existential crisis be like if it was fun".

Critical reception 

In a positive review for Mojo, James McNair called Foreground Music a "garagey art-rock and fractured funk" album and further said that "the New Jersey-born Gallo brings
fizzing zeal and a bounteous grab-bag of ideas, his songs’ hooks as striking as his idiosyncratic lyrics". McNair gave Foreground Music a four star rating. Peter Watts, writing for Uncut magazine gave the album a 7 out of 10 rating. Watts praised the eclectic mix of sounds on the album but said Gallo was at his best when "when occupying a place between the rawness of Jack White and lysergic drawl of Kevin Morby"

Track listing

References

External links 
 Foreground Music on Bandcamp

2023 albums
Ron Gallo albums
Kill Rock Stars albums